HD 102117 b, formally named Leklsullun, is a planet that orbits the star HD 102117. The planet is a small gas giant a fifth the size of Jupiter. It orbits very close to its star, but not in a "torch orbit" like the famous 51 Pegasi b. It is one of the smallest extrasolar planets discovered so far.

In 2004, the Anglo-Australian Planet Search announced a planet orbiting the star HD 102117. A short time later the HARPS team also announced the presence of a planet around this same star HD 102117. Both groups detected this planet using the radial velocity method.

References

External links 
 

Exoplanets discovered in 2005
Giant planets
Centaurus (constellation)
Exoplanets detected by radial velocity
Exoplanets with proper names

de:HD 102117 b